Isaak Shvarts may refer to:

 Isaac Schwartz (1923–2009), Soviet composer
 Isaac Izrailevich Schwartz (1879–1951), director of the Ukrainian Cheka and member of the Communist Party of Ukraine